This is a list of third party and independent United States state governors, that is, governors that have not been members of the Democratic, Republican, Whig, National Republican, Democratic-Republican, or Federalist parties.

Since its founding, the United States has been a two-party system, and it is rare for independents or members of third parties to be elected to high offices such as the governorship. However, it has happened on several occasions, which are documented below. The most recent-serving independent governor is Bill Walker of Alaska, who served 2014–2018. The most recent member of a third party (not an independent) elected to a governorship is Jesse Ventura, a member of the Independence Party of Minnesota who was elected Governor of Minnesota in 1998.

While there have been few third parties that have gained traction at the national level, several states have been three-party systems at one point or another. These include Minnesota with the Farmer–Labor Party from 1918–1944, North Dakota with the Nonpartisan League from 1915–1956, Wisconsin with the Progressive Party from 1934–1946, Nevada with the Silver Party from 1892–1911, Virginia with the Readjuster Party from 1877–1895, and South Carolina with the Nullifier Party from 1828–1839.

Not included are governors who were elected before the state's ratification of the United States Constitution or governors of U.S. territories prior to their admission to the Union. Also not included are military or appointed governors of former Confederate states after the American Civil War.

Pre-Reconstruction (1787–1865)

Post-Reconstruction (1865–present)

See also
 Third party officeholders in the United States
 List of current United States governors
 List of third party performances in United States elections

References

Third Party
United States state governors
Third party (United States)